The Australasian Athletics Championships was an athletics competition between male athletes principally from Australia and New Zealand that was held between 1893 and 1927. They were the precursor to the national Australian Athletics Championships, which replaced the competition from 1930 onwards.

The competition emerged from an inter-colonial athletics event in 1890 between New South Wales, Victoria, Queensland and New Zealand before becoming a formalised event. This marked a progression towards organised sports competition among the emerging colonial regions in the British Empire and occurred at the same time as the Sheffield Shield cricket developed into a formal regional tournament. An Australasian Championships in tennis for the colonies was established in 1905 and would later become the Australian Open.

During the same period, athletics organisers of the region began to cooperate more and the Amateur Athletic Union of Australasia (AAUA) was established in 1897. This became the basis for the modern-day national federation, Athletics Australia, after New Zealand split in 1928. Sports cooperation between Australia and New Zealand also resulted in a combined national team being sent as Australasia at the Olympics in 1908 and 1912.

The main base of the athletics programme consisted of track and field events measured in imperial units. The first edition in 1893 featured ten track events and five field events for men. The track events were three sprints, two middle-distance races, a 3-mile long-distance race, two hurdling events, and two track walking events. On the field, there were high jump, long jump, pole vault, shot put and hammer throw. The programme remained in this format until 1922, when three new events were added (javelin throw, discus throw, and mile medley relay). A decathlon was held for three editions from 1924 onwards and a men's triple jump was contested in 1927 only. A marathon event was included on the programme in 1909 and the prominence of the event marked the growing importance of the newly developed distance in the region.

Among the winners during the competition's lifespan were three-time Olympic sprint athlete Stan Rowley, 1908 Olympic race walk medalist Harry Kerr, sprinter Nigel Barker and hurdler George William Smith.

Editions
Key

Champions

100 yards
1890: 
1893: 
1896: 
1897: 
1899: 
1901: 
1904: 
1905: 
1908: 
1909: 
1911: 
1914: 
1920: 
1922: 
1924: 
1926: 
1927:

220 yards
1890: 
1893: 
1896: 
1897: 
1899: 
1901: 
1904: 
1905: 
1908: 
1909: 
1911: 
1914: 
1920: 
1922: 
1924: 
1926: 
1927:

440 yards
1890: 
1893: 
1896: 
1897: 
1899: 
1901: 
1904: 
1905: 
1908: 
1909: 
1911: 
1914: 
1920: 
1922: 
1924: 
1926: 
1927:

880 yards
1890: 
1893: 
1896: 
1897: 
1899: 
1901: 
1904: 
1905: 
1908: 
1909: 
1911: 
1914: 
1920: 
1922: 
1924: 
1926: 
1927:

Mile run
1890: 
1893: 
1896: 
1897: 
1899: 
1901: 
1904: 
1905: 
1908: 
1909: 
1911: 
1914: 
1920: 
1922: 
1924: 
1926: 
1927:

Three miles
1890: 
1893: 
1896: 
1897: 
1899: 
1901: 
1904: 
1905: 
1908: 
1909: 
1911: 
1914: 
1920: 
1922: 
1924: 
1926: 
1927:

120 yards hurdles
1890: 
1893: 
1896: 
1897: 
1899: 
1901: 
1904: 
1905: 
1908: 
1909: 
1911: 
1914: 
1920: 
1922: 
1924: 
1926: 
1927:

440 yards hurdles
1893: 
1896: 
1897: 
1899: 
1901: 
1904: 
1905: 
1908: 
1909: 
1911: 
1914: 
1920: 
1922: 
1924: 
1926: 
1927:  &

High jump
1890: 
1893: 
1896: 
1897: 
1899: 
1901: 
1904: 
1905: 
1908: 
1909: 
1911: 
1914: 
1920: 
1922: 
1924: 
1926: 
1927:

Pole vault
1893: 
1896: 
1897: 
1899: 
1901: 
1904: 
1905: 
1908: 
1909:  & 
1911: 
1914:  & 
1920: 
1922: 
1924: 
1926: 
1927:

Long jump
1890: 
1893: 
1896: 
1897: 
1899: 
1901: 
1904: 
1905: 
1908: 
1909: 
1911: 
1914: 
1920: 
1922: 
1924: 
1926: 
1927:

Triple jump
1927:

Shot put
1893: 
1896: 
1897: 
1899: 
1901: 
1904: 
1905: 
1908: 
1909: 
1911: 
1914: 
1920: 
1922: 
1924: 
1926: 
1927:

Discus throw
1922: 
1924: 
1926: 
1927:

Hammer throw
1893: 
1896: 
1897: 
1899: 
1901: 
1904: 
1905: 
1908: 
1909: 
1911: 
1914: 
1920: 
1922: 
1924: 
1926: 
1927:

Javelin throw
1922: 
1924: 
1926: 
1927:

Decathlon
1924: 
1926: 
1927:

One mile walk
1890: 
1893: 
1896: 
1897: 
1899: 
1901: 
1904: 
1905: 
1908: 
1909: 
1911: 
1914: 
1920: 
1922: 
1924: 
1926: 
1927:

Three mile walk
1890: 
1893: 
1896: 
1897: 
1899: 
1901: 
1904: 
1905: 
1908: 
1909: 
1911: 
1914: 
1920: 
1922: 
1924: 
1926: 
1927:

One mile relay
1922: 
1924: 
1926: 
1927:

References

Champions
Ausraliasian Championships. GBR Athletics. Retrieved 2021-01-22.

Athletics competitions in Australia
Athletics competitions in New Zealand
Athletics competitions in Oceania
Recurring sporting events established in 1893
Recurring sporting events disestablished in 1927
1893 establishments in Australia
1927 disestablishments in Australia
Events in the British Empire
International athletics competitions hosted by Australia
International athletics competitions hosted by New Zealand
Defunct athletics competitions